Hans-Georg Jörger (born 26 November 1903, date of death unknown) was a German fencer. He won a bronze medal in the team sabre event at the 1936 Summer Olympics.

References

1903 births
Year of death missing
German male fencers
Olympic fencers of Germany
Fencers at the 1936 Summer Olympics
Olympic bronze medalists for Germany
Olympic medalists in fencing
Medalists at the 1936 Summer Olympics